Victory Township is a civil township of Mason County in the U.S. state of Michigan. The population was 1,383 at the 2010 census.

History
Victory Township was organized in 1868. The township was perhaps named in commemoration of Union victory in the Civil War.

Communities
Chapple Corners was an unincorporated community on the Big Sable River.  It was founded in 1864 and had a post office from 1874 until 1881.

Geography

Demographics
At the 2000 census, there were 1,444 people, 497 households and 376 families residing in the township. The racial make-up was 95.91% White, 0.55% African American, 0.83% Native American, 0.42% Asian, 0.97% from other races, and 1.32% from two or more races. Hispanic or Latino of any race were 1.87% of the population.

There were 497 households, of which 34.6% had children under the age of 18 living with them, 63.6% were married couples living together, 6.4% had a female householder with no husband present, and 24.3% were non-families. 20.1% of all households were made up of individuals, and 7.4% had someone living alone who was 65 years of age or older. The average household size was 2.72 and the average family size was 3.12.

25.6% of the population were under the age of 18, 6.4% from 18 to 24, 28.3% from 25 to 44, 24.1% from 45 to 64 and 15.7% were 65 years of age or older. The median age was 39 years. For every 100 females, there were 99.7 males. For every 100 females age 18 and over, there were 94.9 males.

The median household income was $41,667 and the median family income was $44,402. Males had a median income of $32,391 and females $21,591. The per capita income was $17,140. About 7.0% of families and 7.8% of the population were below the poverty line, including 7.5% of those under age 18 and 7.7% of those age 65 or over.

References

Townships in Mason County, Michigan
Townships in Michigan
Populated places established in 1868
1868 establishments in Michigan